Keabetswe 'KB' Motsilanyane (born 8 April 1979), sometimes known as KB Mamosadi, is a multi-award winning South African performing artist, singer, songwriter, producer, actress, dancer and business woman. Born and raised in Moruleng, North West in South Africa, KB grew up passionate about the music and arts in the province.  She joined the legendary South African group, Crowded Crew, who shot to fame in the late 1990's.  In 2001, KB joined the e-TV soapie Backstage as herself, which coincided with the release of her debut album, Beautiful Vibrations (2002), which featured the hit song 'O A lla', earning her the name Mamosadi. She is best known for her roles in the popular series Backstage, Mthunzini.com, Rhythm City and 7de Laan.

Personal life
She was born on 8 April 1979 in Moruleng, South Africa

She was once married to Terry Pinana before they separated in 2007. She is a mother of one son.

Career
KB has 6 albums to date, which have made her a renowned award-winning South African artist.  She is an all round entertainer that has shared arenas with the best of both local and international artists, Eve, Sibongile Khumalo, Busta Rhymes, Beyonce, Prime Circle, Ashanti, Dwele and Brandy.

She started her acting career in 1999 with theater plays. She is best known for the show Backstage where she played the role of 'KayBee'. Post her departure on the show, she then played the role of 'Lucilla Vilakazi' in the popular television series Rhythm City. She became a regular cast in the series until her departure in 2015. In 2017, she joined the South African Afrikaans popular soapie 7de Laan and played the role of a feisty lawyer, 'Lesedi'. She also starred in season two of the series Thola as 'Dibuseng Makwarela'. KB has earned two nominations for the Golden Horn Award for Best Actress in a TV Soap in 2008 and 2011.

Awards
She has received several musical awards:

 2003 Metro FM Award Best RnB 
 2003 Metro FM Awards Best Newcomer 
 2003 SAMA Best RNB 
 2004 Metro FM Award Best Female Artist 
 2004 Metro FM Award Best RnB 
 2005 & 2006 Kid's Choice Awards Favourite Female Artist 
 2005 Metro FM Award Best Female Artist 
 2008 SAMA Best Urban Pop 2008 Metro FM Award Best Styled Artist

Filmography

References

External links
 

Living people
South African television actresses
21st-century South African women singers
South African film actresses
1979 births
People from North West (South African province)
20th-century South African women singers
South African rhythm and blues musicians